The Brothers Karamazov (translit. Bratya Karamazovy) is a 1969 Soviet film directed by Kirill Lavrov, Ivan Pyryev and Mikhail Ulyanov. It is based on the 1880 novel by the famous Russian author Fyodor Dostoevsky. It was nominated for the Academy Award for Best Foreign Language Film. It was also entered into the 6th Moscow International Film Festival, winning Pyryev a Special Prize.

Plot summary

Cast
 Mikhail Ulyanov as Dmitri Karamazov
 Lionella Pyryeva as Grushenka
 Kirill Lavrov as Ivan Karamazov
 Andrey Myagkov as Alyosha Karamazov
 Mark Prudkin as Fyodor Pavlovich Karamazov
 Svetlana Korkoshko as Yekaterina Ivanovna
 Valentin Nikulin as Pavel Smerdyakov
 Pavel Pavlenko as elder Zosima
 Andrei Abrikosov as Kuzma Kuzmich Samsonov
 Gennadi Yukhtin as Father Paisi
 Anatoly Adoskin as Examining magistrate
 Rada Volshaninova as Gipsy
 Tamara Nosova as Marya Kondratyevna
 Nikita Podgorny as Mikhail Osipovich Rakitin
 Ivan Lapikov as Lyagavyj

Reception
The film was the most popular movie at the USSR box office in 1969.

See also
 List of submissions to the 42nd Academy Awards for Best Foreign Language Film
 List of Soviet submissions for the Academy Award for Best Foreign Language Film

References

External links
 
 

1969 films
Soviet drama films
1960s Russian-language films
Films based on The Brothers Karamazov
Mosfilm films
1969 in the Soviet Union
Films directed by Kirill Lavrov
Films directed by Ivan Pyryev
Films directed by Mikhail Ulyanov
1969 drama films